Viscount Bolingbroke is a current title in the Peerage of Great Britain created in 1712 for Henry St John. He was simultaneously made Baron St John, of Lydiard Tregoze in the County of Wilts. Since 1751, the titles are merged with the titles of Viscount St John and Baron St John in the same peerage.

Family background
John St John (1585–1648) was the nephew of Oliver St John, 1st Viscount Grandison (1559–1630), lord deputy governor of Ireland from 1616 to 1622, and distant cousin of the Barons St John of Bletsoe, later Earls of Bolingbroke.

Grants of titles

Baronetcy in 1611
John St John later represented Wiltshire in Parliament and was a strong royalist during the Civil War. On 22 May 1611, he was created a Baronet, of Lydiard Tregoze in Wiltshire, in the Baronetage of England.

Baronies and viscountcies
A younger son of John St John, 3rd Baronet, was elected for Wiltshire and Wootton Bassett, Wiltshire equally his son in turn (4th Baronet). In 1716 the latter was created Baron St John, of Battersea in the County of Surrey, and Viscount St John, with remainder to his second son (who inherited) and in default third son, as his eldest son Henry St John had already been created Baron St John, of Lydiard Tregoze, and Viscount Bolingbroke in 1712 (see below). He also represented Wootton Bassett in Parliament. In 1751 his son, the 3rd Viscount, succeeded his uncle as 2nd Viscount Bolingbroke and 2nd Baron St John according to a special remainder in the letters patent.

The titles have remained united since. The son of the "second son" mentioned, the 3rd and 4th Viscount, was elected briefly for Cricklade, Wiltshire.  the titles are held by his descendant, the 8th Viscount Bolingbroke and 9th Viscount St John. He lives in New Zealand.  As of 28 February 2014, the present Baronet has not successfully proven his succession and is therefore not on the Official Roll of the Baronetage, with the baronetcy considered dormant since 1974.

The titles Baron St John, of Lydiard Tregoze in the County of Wilts, and Viscount Bolingbroke were created in the Peerage of Great Britain in 1712 for the politician and orator the Hon. Henry St  John, the eldest son of Henry St John, 1st Viscount St John. The peerages were created with remainder to his father and his male heirs. Lord Bolingbroke died childless and was succeeded according to the special remainder by his nephew, the second Viscount, who had already succeeded as third Viscount St John in 1749 (see above).

Family seats and abodes

An established family seat was, from 1420 until sale in 1943, Lydiard House, Lydiard Tregoze, Wiltshire.

From 1648 until 1765 the family had a house near to London, namely the forerunner to the wider Battersea Park area, Bolingbroke House, which was then in the county of Surrey.  This became the de facto seat of the lord of the manor title inherited from the 1st Baronet from Viscount Grandison, buried there with great pomp in 1648.  In 1742 the then Lord Bolingbroke, who, in spite of his attainder, had been enabled to inherit the estate by an Act of 1725, lent the manor house to his friend Hugh Hume, 3rd Earl of Marchmont. Later he settled there himself, either in 1743 or early in the following year and there spent the remainder of his life. He was buried in the family vault in Battersea Church in 1751. His nephew and heir Frederick, second Viscount Bolingbroke, sold the Battersea estate about 1763. It was purchased by John Viscount Spencer, created Earl Spencer in 1765.

Coat of arms

The heraldic blazon for the armorials of the St John family is: Argent, on a chief gules two mullets or. This can be translated as: a white shield with a red rectangle at the top holding two golden stars.

St John Baronets, of Lydiard Tregoze (1611)
 Sir John St John, 1st Baronet (died 1648)
 Sir John St John, 2nd Baronet (1638–1657)
 Sir Walter St John, 3rd Baronet (1622–1708)
 Sir Henry St John, 4th Baronet (1652–1742) (created Viscount St John in 1716)

Viscounts St John (1716)
 Henry St John, 1st Viscount St John (1652–1742)
 John St John, 2nd Viscount St John (–1749)
 Frederick St John, 2nd Viscount Bolingbroke, 3rd Viscount St John (1732–1787)
 George Richard St John, 3rd Viscount Bolingbroke, 4th Viscount St John (1761–1824)
 Henry St John, 4th Viscount Bolingbroke, 5th Viscount St John (1786–1851)
 Henry St John, 5th Viscount Bolingbroke, 6th Viscount St John (1820–1899)
 Vernon Henry St John, 6th Viscount Bolingbroke, 7th Viscount St John (1896–1974)
 Kenneth Oliver Musgrave St John, 7th Viscount Bolingbroke, 8th Viscount St John (1927–2010)
 Henry FitzRoy St John, 8th Viscount Bolingbroke, 9th Viscount St John (1957–2011)
 Nicholas Alexander Mowbray St. John, 9th Viscount Bolingbroke, 10th Viscount St John (born 1974)

(The current Viscount's eldest son is his heir apparent.)

Viscounts Bolingbroke (1712)
 Henry St John, 1st Viscount Bolingbroke (1678–1751)
 Frederick St John, 2nd Viscount Bolingbroke, 3rd Viscount St John (1732–1787)
see above for further succession

See also
 Baron St John
 Earl of Bolingbroke
 Viscount Grandison
 Earl of Orkney

Notes

References

External links
 
 Kidd, Charles, Williamson, David (editors). Debrett's Peerage and Baronetage (1990 edition). New York: St Martin's Press, 1990.
 
 

Viscountcies in the Peerage of Great Britain
Peerages created with special remainders
St John family
Noble titles created in 1712
1712 establishments in Great Britain